The men's long jump at the 1958 European Athletics Championships was held in Stockholm, Sweden, at Stockholms Olympiastadion on 19 and 20 August 1958.

Medalists

Results

Final
20 August

Qualification
19 August

Participation
According to an unofficial count, 21 athletes from 15 countries participated in the event.

 (1)
 (1)
 (2)
 (1)
 (1)
 (1)
 (1)
 (1)
 (2)
 (2)
 (1)
 (2)
 (2)
 (2)
 (1)

References

Long jump
Long jump at the European Athletics Championships